Eugene Nicolas Kozloff (26 September 1920 – 4 March 2017) was an American marine biologist and botanist at Shannon Point Marine Center on Fidalgo Island, Washington.  He was an emeritus professor of the Friday Harbor Laboratories, University of Washington, and is best known for writing field guides for the Pacific Northwest Region of the United States.

Field guides 
 Kozloff, E.N. 1973. Seashore life of Puget Sound, the Strait of Georgia, and the San Juan Archipelago. Seattle, Washington, University of Washington Press, 282 p.
 Kozloff, E.N. 1974. Keys to the marine invertebrates of Puget Sound, the San Juan Archipelago, and adjacent regions. Seattle, Washington, University of Washington Press, 226 p.
 Kozloff, E.N. 1976.  Plants and animals of the Pacific Northwest: an illustrated guide to the natural history of western Oregon, Washington, and British Columbia. Seattle, Washington, University of Washington Press, 264 p.
 Kozloff, E.N. 1993.  Seashore life of the Pacific Northwest: an illustrated guide to northern California, Oregon, Washington, and British Columbia. 370 p.
 Kozloff, E.N. 1996. Marine Invertebrates of the Pacific Northwest with additions and corrections. Seattle, Washington, University of Washington Press, 552 p.
 Beidleman, L.H. & E.N. Kozloff. 2003. Plants of the San Francisco Bay Region: Mendocino to Monterey. Berkeley, California, University of California Press. 514 p.
 Kozloff, E.N. 2005. Plants of western Oregon, Washington & British Columbia. Portland, Oregon, Timber Press. 608 p.

Eponymous taxa 
The following species have been named in honor of Dr. Kozloff.

 Acetabulastoma kozloffi Hart, 1971 - Ostracoda
 Collastoma kozloffi Westervelt, 1981 - Turbellaria
 Crebricoma kozloffi (Chatton & Lwoff, 1950) - Ciliophora
 Echinoderes kozloffi Higgins, 1977 - Kinorhyncha
 Genostoma kozloffi Hyra, 1993 - Turbellaria
 Gymnodinioides kozloffi Landers, 2004 - Ciliophora
 Myxobolus kozloffi Wyatt, 1979 - Cnidaria
 Tubificoides kozloffi Baker, 1983 - Oligochaeta
 Urceolaria kozloffi P.C. Bradbury, 1970 - Ciliophora

The following genera have been named in honor of Dr. Kozloff

 Kozloffia de Puytorac, 1968 - Ciliophora
 Kozloffiella Raabe, 1970 - Ciliophora

References

1920 births
2017 deaths
American naturalists
American marine biologists
Iranian emigrants to the United States